AVFoundation is a multimedia framework with APIs in Objective-C and Swift, which provides high-level services for working with time-based audiovisual media on Apple Darwin-based operating systems: iOS, macOS, tvOS, and watchOS.  It was first introduced in iOS 4 and has seen significant changes in iOS 5 and iOS 6. Starting with Mac OS X Lion, it is now the default media framework for the macOS platform.

AVKit
As a component of AVFoundation, AVKit is an API that comes with OS X Mavericks 10.9+ and can be used with Xcode 5.0+ for developing media player software for Mac.

The AVKit software framework is replacing QTKit which was deprecated in OS X Mavericks, and was discontinued with the release of macOS Catalina.

See also
QuickTime
Media Foundation

References

External links
 
 Moving to AV Kit and AV Foundation presentation (video and slides) from WWDC 2013 at Apple Developer
 Moving to AV Kit and AV Foundation slides at Huihoo Foundation Documents
 Technical Note TN2300: Transitioning QTKit Code to AV Foundation at Apple Developer Archive

Apple Inc. software
Software frameworks
MacOS APIs